Alex Barron is a British juggler.

Career 
Barron was born in London. He started juggling in summer 2006. He has set numerous world records for juggling with more than nine balls. He became the first person to ever juggle eleven balls, and to flash 13 and 14 balls.
In August 2010, aged 16, he set his first world record when he did 15 catches with 11 balls, tying with Bruce Sarafian's world record from 2001.

Records 
Barron holds the following world records (as of 2019):
 12 balls: 20 catches in 2017
 13 balls: 15 catches in 2013
 14 balls: 14 catches in 2017

Barron received a Master of Science degree in Artificial Intelligence in 2017 from Stanford University.

See also
List of jugglers
Juggling world records

References

Jugglers
Living people
Year of birth missing (living people)
People from London
Stanford University alumni